The Department of Health and Human Services (DHHS) was a government department in Victoria, Australia. Commencing operation on 1 January 2015, it was responsible for the state's health system, as well as various other aspects of social policy.

The DHHS was formed following machinery of government changes in the aftermath of the 2014 state election, assuming the functions of the previous Department of Health and Department of Human Services, respectively.

After further re-structures in January 2019, the Department's responsibilities relating to sport and recreation were instead transferred to the newly-created Department of Jobs, Precincts and Regions.

On 30 November 2020, the Premier announced that Health and Human Services functions would be separated into a new Department of Health (DoH) and the Department of Families, Fairness and Housing (DFFH). The new DoH would oversee public health, aging, mental health and ambulance service portfolios while DFFH would hold responsibility for child protection, housing and disability. As part of this change, DFFH would gain a number of functions that currently reside with The Department of Premier and Cabinet. The split took effect on 1 February 2021.

Ministers 
Until its dissolution, the DHHS supported five ministers in the following portfolio areas:

Functions
The DHHS has responsibility for the following policy areas:
 Public health
 Ambulance services
 Housing
 Mental health
 Child protection
 Family services
 Disability services
 Ageing
 Family violence
 Community health

References

External links 
Human Services Provides information about housing and community services in Victoria and the development of policies to improve the lives of vulnerable people including children, young people and those living with a disability.
Health Provides information about planning, policy development, funding and regulation of health services and activities that promote and protect Victoria’s health. This includes delivery of mental health and aged care services in Victoria.
Housing Provides information about housing and housing assistance in Victoria.
Sports and Recreation Provides information about sport and recreation in Victoria.
Better Health Channel Provides information on health and medical information.

Medical and health organisations based in Victoria (Australia)
Victoria
2015 establishments in Australia
Ministries established in 2015
Health policy in Australia
2021 disestablishments in Australia
Ministries disestablished in 2021
Former government departments of Victoria (Australia)